Zhuolu is a town and the county seat of Zhuolu County, northwestern Hebei province, Northern China.

Historical uncertainty
Modern Zhuolu may or may not have been the location of the historical Battle of Zhuolu. However, it is promoted for tourism as such. Modern Zhuolu may or may not have been the location of what is claimed to be a city founded by the legendary Yellow Emperor, Huáng dì, although there is evidence to support this case.
According to tradition, Zhuolu was a city that the Yellow Emperor, Huáng dì, founded. Zhuolu Town, is also considered by many to be a legendary birthplace of the Miao and has a statue of Chi You commemorating him as the ancestor of the Hmong.

References

Notes

Sources
Wu, K. C. (1982). The Chinese Heritage. New York: Crown Publishers. .

Township-level divisions of Hebei
Zhuolu County